Sepak takraw at the 2018 Asian Games was held at Ranau Sports Hall, Palembang, Indonesia. It was held from 19 August to 1 September.

Schedule

Medalists

Men

Women

Medal table

Participating nations
A total of 253 athletes from 15 nations competed in sepak takraw at the 2018 Asian Games:

References

External links
Sepak takraw at the 2018 Asian Games
Official Result Book – Sepaktakraw

 
2018 Asian Games events
2018